General elections to the Cortes Generales were held in Spain in 1820. At stake were all 149 seats in the Congress of Deputies.

History
The 1813  elections were the first ones held since the approval of  the 1812 Cádiz Constitution. Vote was secret for the first time. All males over 21 years old, a total of 3,216,460 people, had the right to vote.

Results

References

 Estadísticas históricas de España: siglos XIX-XX.

Elections in Spain
1813 in Spain
1813
October 1813 events
1813 elections in Europe